Make It Come True is the debut album released by Australian girl band Girlfriend. The album was released in September 1992 and peaked at number 6 on the ARIA chart. The album was certified platinum.

At the ARIA Music Awards of 1993, Girlfriend were nominated for Best New Talent, losing out to Things of Stone and Wood.

Track listing

Charts

Weekly charts

Year-end charts

Certifications

References

1992 debut albums
Girlfriend (band) albums